Katenluy-e Olya (also Romanized as Katenlūy-e ‘Olyā; also known as Katenlūy-e Bālā) is a village in Dizaj Rural District, in the Central District of Khoy County, West Azerbaijan Province, Iran. At the 2006 census, its population was 42, in 10 families.

References 

Populated places in Khoy County